The HESA Dorna ("Crane") is a jet-powered Iranian training aircraft. The aircraft was first publicised in 1999 when Iranian air force General Habibollah Baghal claimed that a locally designed Dorna trainer aircraft had entered production.

See also 
Military of Iran
Islamic Republic of Iran Air Force
List of Iranian Air Force aircraft
Iranian military industry

References 

Dorna
1990s Iranian military trainer aircraft